"Can You Hear Me?" is a song by New Zealand rock band Evermore, it is the third single from their third studio album Truth of the World: Welcome to the Show and is one of the band's personal favourites, seeing it as one of the most emotional and rewarding songs they've ever written. It's the last track on the album and tells the story of the main character, Max, who crashed his car into a river and sees his whole life run before his eyes. The song is currently being used for a Westpac television commercial. It is also currently being used for the Seven Network promotion of the Grey's Anatomy season five season finale.

Music video

The band finished filming the video which was filmed in Johannesburg, South Africa and directed by Tristin Holmes. It became available to Evermore's fans at midnight on 3 June 2009. The beginning of the video features the track "Faster" from the same album and then progresses into the title song. The video has recently become available on iTunes in two versions: Single version which only consists of the title song and the extended album version which also features the track 'Faster'

Pete Hume, in a message about the video said:

Track listing

Release history

Official Versions
 "Can You Hear Me" (Album Version) – 6:43
 "Can You Hear Me" (Single Version) – 5:39
 "Can You Hear Me" (Radio Version) / ("Evermore" Album Edit) – 4:09

References

Evermore (band) songs
2009 singles
2009 songs
Songs written by Dann Hume
Songs written by Jon Hume
Warner Music Australasia singles